This is a list of books and essays about Sam Peckinpah. the an American film director and screenwriter.

List

References

Peckinpah